Mikrogeophagus is a genus of small cichlids native to the Amazon basin in South America. M. ramirezi is native to the Llanos of the Orinoco basin. M.  altispinosus is from the Rio Mamoré and the middle and lower Rio Guaporé basins in Bolivia and Brazil. The third form of Mikrogeophagus, M. maculicauda,is found in the Rio Pindatuba (upper Rio Guaporé basin.)

M.ramirezi and M. altispinosus are popular with aquarists, especially M. ramirezi.

These species spawn on flat rocks or leaves and not in caves like fishes from the closely related cichlid genus Apistogramma.

Species
The currently recognized species in this genus are:
 Mikrogeophagus altispinosus (Haseman, 1911) (Bolivian Ram)
 Mikrogeophagus ramirezi (G. S. Myers & Harry, 1948) (ram cichlid)
 Mikrogeophagus maculicauda

 
Geophagini
Cichlid genera